The 2022–23 Wisconsin Badgers men's basketball team represents the University of Wisconsin–Madison in the 2022–23 NCAA Division I men's basketball season. The Badgers are led by eighth-year head coach Greg Gard and played their home games at the Kohl Center in Madison, Wisconsin as members of the Big Ten Conference. They finished the regular season 17–14, 9–11 in Big Ten play to finish in a tie for 11th place. As the No. 12 seed in the Big Ten tournament, they lost to Ohio State in the first round. They received an at-large bid to the National Invitation Tournament where they defeated Bradley in the first round and Liberty in the second round.

Previous season
The Badgers finished the 2021–22 season 25–8, 15–5 in Big Ten play to finish in a tie for first place. As the No. 2 seed in the Big Ten Tournament, they lost to Michigan State in the quarterfinals. They received an at-large bid to the NCAA tournament, their 26th trip to the NCAA Tournament, as the No. 3 seed in the Midwest region. The Badgers defeated Colgate in the First Round before losing to Iowa State in the Second Round.

Offseason

Departures
All players listed as "graduated" are tentative departures unless otherwise noted.

Incoming transfers

2022 recruiting class

Roster

Schedule and results

|-
!colspan=12 style=| France trip

|-
!colspan=12 style=| Exhibition

|-
!colspan=12 style=|Regular season

|-  
!colspan=12 style=|Big Ten tournament

|-  
!colspan=12 style=|NIT

Source

Rankings

*AP does not release post-NCAA Tournament rankings.

Player statistics

References

Wisconsin Badgers men's basketball seasons
Wisconsin
Badgers men's basketball team
Badgers men's basketball team
Wisconsin